Saiyad Sana Khan (born 21 August 1988) is an Indian businesswoman and former actress. She predominantly worked in Hindi, Tamil, and Telugu language films.

Khan began her career in modeling and went on to appear in advertisements, feature films, and television shows. She has acted in 14 films across 5 languages and has appeared in over 50 ad films. She was a contestant on the reality show Bigg Boss 6 in 2012 and became a finalist. In 2020, she announced her retirement from the film industry.

Early life
Sana Khan was born  and raised in Mumbai (Dharavi). Her father is a Malayali Muslim from Kannur, Kerala, and her mother, Saeeda, is from Mumbai.

Career

Films
Sana Khan made her acting debut in the 2005 low-budget adult Hindi film Yehi Hai High Society. She subsequently started appearing in television commercials and other ads.

Khan's debut Tamil film Silambattam, produced by Lakshmi Movie Makers, was released in December 2008. Silambarasan, the film's lead actor, who had previously signed and then dropped her for a role in his film Kettavan, called her again for the female lead role in Silambattam after seeing her ad with Shah Rukh Khan. She said in an interview with The Hindu, "Silambarasan came to Mumbai looking for a fresh face for his film Silambattam. There he saw me and selected me. I knew I had to work hard to make it big in the Tamil film industry". Khan regards the film as her first break. She received praise for her portrayal of Janu, a talkative, tomboyish brahmin village girl, and won the 2009 ITFA Best New Actress Award in Singapore.

In March 2010, her next Tamil film, Thambikku Indha Ooru, was released. Later that year, Khan ventured into the Telugu film industry, appearing in Nandamuri Kalyan Ram's Kalyanram Kathi, released in November 2010. Khan's next release was the February 2011 bilingual thriller Gaganam / Payanam – shot in Telugu and Tamil, respectively – which was based on an aircraft hijack theme.

In May 2011, Khan stepped into Kannada films with Golden Movies' Kool...Sakkath Hot Maga. In September 2011, her next Tamil film, Aayiram Vilakku, was released, in which she played a Madurai girl. In the March 2012 Telugu film Mr. Nookayya, Khan played a waitress in a pub, adding glamour to the film. Khan made her Malayalam film debut with Climax (2013 film), loosely based on the Hindi film The Dirty Picture, playing the South Indian actress Silk Smitha. Khan was also signed to her sixth Tamil film, Thalaivan, produced by Blue Ocean Pictures.

Khan plays a daughter of main antagonist Danny Denzongpa in the Bollywood film Jai Ho, released on 24 January 2014. She did the film Wajah Tum Ho opposite Sharman Joshi and Gurmeet Choudhary. The film was a flop at Box Office India. Her bold scenes with Gurmeet and Rajneesh Duggal in the film were much discussed after the trailer was released on YouTube. Khan did a special appearance in Toilet: Ek Prem Katha in which she was seen portraying Akshay Kumar's girlfriend. Her upcoming film is Tom, Dick and Harry 2 in which shares the screen with Aftab Shivdasani and Sharman Joshi.

TV commercials
Khan has acted in over 50 ad films, including a cosmetic commercial directed by Shirish Kunder in July 2007. She has also done ads for the deodorant brand Secret Temptation, Yatra.com, and the Xbox 360 video game console.

In March 2007, Khan's TV commercial for the men's underwear brand Amul Macho showed her provocatively scrubbing and washing some underwear, simulating an orgasm. It created great controversy and was banned by the Indian government on the grounds of sexual profanity. Khan remarked, "Forget about the ban and people taking out morchas (protests) against me and burning my posters in Bombay. At the end of it people from the creative field have loved it." The company rehired Khan, shot a sequel to the commercial with a different theme, and released it in February 2008.

Bigg Boss
In October 2012, Khan was a celebrity contestant in the sixth season of the Indian version of the reality TV show Big Brother, Bigg Boss. Before entering the show, she said, "I am going to flaunt my age and the fact that I am the youngest. I am going into the house without any preparation. I want to be spontaneous and show the world the real me." She gained a lot of popularity from the show and managed to stay in the show till the end, though she finished in third place. She told PTI, "I am happy to have reached top three. I did not expect this."

Personal life

In February 2019, Khan confirmed her relationship with choreographer Melvin Louis. They are separated as of February 2020.

On 8 October 2020, Khan posted a message on Instagram saying that she was quitting the entertainment industry and would "serve humanity and follow the order of her Creator."

On 21 November 2020, Khan married Islamic scholar Mufti Anas Sayed in Surat.

Filmography

Films

Television

Web series

References

External links

 
 

1988 births
Indian television actresses
Indian film actresses
Female models from Mumbai
Living people
Malayali people
Actresses in Tamil cinema
Actresses in Malayalam cinema
Actresses in Hindi cinema
Actresses in Telugu cinema
Actresses in Kannada cinema
21st-century Indian actresses
Actresses from Mumbai
Actresses in Hindi television
Bigg Boss (Hindi TV series) contestants
Fear Factor: Khatron Ke Khiladi participants